HRYW (95.9 FM, "Radio Panamericana") is a radio station based in Tegucigalpa, Honduras under the corporate ownership of Sociedad Mercantil CIMADIAL S. de R.L. It broadcasts news, sport and music and station broadcasts on 95.9 MHz FM.

External links
Official site
Live on Honduras 504

Radio stations in Honduras
Mass media in Tegucigalpa
Radio stations established in 1966